The Papuan boobook (Ninox theomacha), jungle boobook or jungle hawk-owl, is a medium-sized, dark-colored owl. It has a dark gray-brown facial disk with lighter colored eyebrows, sooty or chocolate underparts, and mainly dark gray wings.

It lives mainly in lowland forests, montane forests, and submontane forests, mainly on the forests' edges. It is native to New Guinea.

Uses of the name 
The Jungle Hawk Owl is the name of a long-endurance unmanned aerial vehicle developed by students at MIT.

References 

Papuan boobook
Birds of prey of New Guinea
Owls of Oceania
Papuan boobook
Papuan boobook